Rådmansgatan may refer to:

  – a street in Malmö, Sweden
 Rådmansgatan, Stockholm – a street in Stockholm, Sweden
 Rådmansgatan metro station – a metro station in Stockholm, Sweden